Rastovac may refer to:

 Rastovac, Bosnia and Herzegovina, a village near Kalinovik, Bosnia
 Rastovac, Grubišno Polje, a village near Grubišno Polje, Bjelovar-Bilogora County, Croatia
 Rastovac, Ivanska, a village near Ivanska, Bjelovar-Bilogora County, Croatia
 Rastovac, Split-Dalmatia County, a village near Zagvozd, Croatia
 Rastovac Budački, a village near Krnjak, Karlovac County, Croatia
 Rastovac (Nikšić), a small town in Nikšić Municipality, Montenegro